Viguiera is a genus of flowering plants in the family Asteraceae. The name honours French physician L. G. Alexandre Viguier (1790–1867). It contains around 150 species, which are commonly known as goldeneyes and are native to the New World. These are herbs to bushy shrubs that bear yellow or orange daisy-like flowers.

Selected species
 Viguiera australis S.F.Blake
 Viguiera cordifolia A.Gray – Heartleaf Goldeneye
 Viguiera dentata (Cav.) Spreng. – Sunflower Goldeneye, Toothleaf Goldeneye
 Viguiera media S.F.Blake
 Viguiera nudicaulis Baker
 Viguiera paneroi B.L.Turner
 Viguiera pazensis Rusby
 Viguiera phenax S.F.Blake – Field Goldeneye
 Viguiera procumbens (Pers.) S.F.Blake
 Viguiera sodiroi (Hieron.) S.F.Blake
 Viguiera stenoloba S.F.Blake – Skeletonleaf Goldeneye
 Viguiera sylvatica Klatt
 Viguiera triloba (A.Gray) J.Olsen – Yellow Streamers
 Viguiera tuberosa (Sch.Bip.) Benth. & Hook.f. ex Griseb.

Formerly placed here
 Bahiopsis deltoidea (as V. deltoidea)
 Bahiopsis laciniata (A.Gray) E.E.Schill. & Panero (as V. laciniata A.Gray) 
 Bahiopsis parishii (Greene) E.E.Schill. & Panero (as V. deltoidea var. parishii (Greene) Vasey & Rose and V. parishii Greene)
 Bahiopsis reticulata (S.Watson) E.E.Schill. & Panero (as V. reticulata S.Watson)
 Helianthus porteri (A.Gray) Pruski (as V. porteri (A.Gray) S.F.Blake)
 Heliomeris longifolia var. annua (M.E.Jones) W.F.Yates (as V. annua (M.E.Jones) W.F.Yates)
 Heliomeris multiflora var. multiflora Nutt. (as V. multiflora (Nutt.) S.F.Blake)

References

External links

USDA Plants Profile
Jepson Manual Treatment
Flora North America Treatment of Bahiopsis

 
Asteraceae genera
Taxonomy articles created by Polbot